"Follow Me" is a song by British girl group Atomic Kitten. It was written by Lucy Abbot, Sara Eker, Dawn Joseph, Steve Robson, and Peter Kearney for their debut album, Right Now (2000), with production helmed by Trevor Steel, John Holliday, and additional producer Quiet Money. "Follow Me" was released as the album's fourth single in October 2000. A departure from the bubblegum pop of Atomic Kitten's first three singles, it introduced a more mature and mellow, R&B-influenced pop sound but was less successful than their previous top 10 hits, peaking at number 20 on the UK Singles Chart.

Music video
The promotional video for "Follow Me" includes Natasha Hamilton, Liz McClarnon and Kerry Katona. It opens with the Kittens near a window in a shadowy room. Before the first chorus the girls are seen in a desert with a pink sky. In the first chorus, the three dance on a disco ball dome in the sky in the clouds. The girls also dance on top of a skyscraper in the city at night, while the skyline is full of old buildings. The roof the girls dance on features a large tattoo-like design. During the bridge section, the Kittens dance in front of a blue cover. The girls also clap their hands with snowballs in the desert setting at night. Before the final chorus, the blue cover lifts up behind Natasha, Kerry and Liz.

Track listings

Notes
  signifies remix and additional production

Credits and personnel
Credits adapted from the liner notes of Right Now.

 Tracy Ackerman – backing vocals
 Atomic Kitten – lead vocals
 Lucy Abbot – writing
 Sara Eker – writing
 Danny G – keyboards
 John Holliday – production
 Mark Jamies – guitar

 Dawn Joseph – writing
 Peter Kearney – writing
 Quiet Money – additional production, remix
 Heff Moraes – mixing
 Jackie Rawe – backing vocals
 Steve Robson – writing
 Trevor Steel – production

Charts

References

2000 singles
2000 songs
Atomic Kitten songs
Innocent Records singles
Songs written by Steve Robson
Virgin Records singles